dnaS or dut is a gene involved in DNA replication in Escherichia coli. It encodes dUTP nucleotidohydrolase, an enzyme responsible for catalyzing the conversion of dUTP to dUMP, thereby ensuring that the organism's DNA contains the nucleobase thymine instead of uracil.

See also 

DUT, the human version of this gene
dnaA
dnaB
dnaC
dnaE
dnaG
dnaH
dnaI
dnaN
dnaP
dnaQ
dnaX
dnaZ

References 

DNA replication